Experiment in Terror is a 1962 American neo-noir thriller film released by Columbia Pictures. It was directed by Blake Edwards and written by Mildred Gordon and Gordon Gordon based on their 1961 novel Operation Terror. The film stars Glenn Ford, Lee Remick, Stefanie Powers and Ross Martin. The musical score was performed by Henry Mancini.

Plot
A sadistic killer, Garland "Red" Lynch, uses a campaign of terror to force San Francisco bank teller Kelly Sherwood to steal $100,000 from the bank for him. Despite Lynch's threat to kill Sherwood or her teenage sister Toby if she goes to the police, Sherwood contacts the San Francisco office of the FBI, where agent John Ripley takes charge of the case.

Ripley interviews a woman who implies that she is involved in some way in a serious crime, but before she can give Ripley the details, Lynch murders her. Sherwood continues to be terrorized with phone calls, an asthmatic condition making the unseen Lynch's voice all the more sinister.

The FBI identifies the criminal, noting that Lynch has a record of convictions for statutory rape, forgery, criminal assault, armed robbery and murder. They track down his girlfriend, Lisa Soong, whose six-year-old son has just had a hip replaced. Lynch is paying all the hospital bills. Because of this, Lisa refuses to believe that Lynch is a criminal and will not cooperate with the investigation. Ripley nevertheless manages to get some information about "Uncle Red" from the boy.

Lynch finally gives Sherwood a time and date to steal the money, and just to make sure that she does, he kidnaps her sister Toby and holds her captive. The climax is a chase through Candlestick Park after a nighttime baseball game between the rival San Francisco Giants and Los Angeles Dodgers. On-field action includes several closeups of Dodger pitcher Don Drysdale. Ripley and his men ultimately surround Lynch on the infield of the stadium. As Lynch takes aim at a police helicopter, Ripley shoots him and he dies on the pitchers' mound.

Cast

 Glenn Ford as John "Rip" Ripley
 Lee Remick as Kelly Sherwood
 Stefanie Powers as Toby Sherwood
 Ross Martin as Garland Humphrey "Red" Lynch
 Roy Poole as Brad
 Ned Glass as Popcorn
 Anita Loo as Lisa Soong
 Patricia Huston as Nancy Ashton
 Gilbert Green as Special agent
 Clifton James as Capt. Moreno
 Al Avalon as Man who picks up Kelly
 William Bryant as Chuck
 Dick Crockett as FBI agent #1
 James Lanphier as Landlord
 Warren Hsieh as Joey Soong
 Sidney Miller as Drunk
 Clarence Lung as Attorney Yung
 Frederic Downs as Welk
 Sherry O'Neil as Edna
 Mari Lynn as Penny
 Harvey Evans as Dave
 William Sharon as Raymond Burkhart
 Don Drysdale as himself

Production

Filming locations
Experiment in Terror was filmed on location in San Francisco. Kelly Sherwood's house is at 100, St. Germain Avenue in the Clarendon Heights district (now demolished). Kelly works at the Crocker-Anglo Bank (now Wells Fargo Bank) located at One Montgomery Street. The climactic chase at the end of the film was filmed at Candlestick Park; other nearby filming locations included Fisherman's Wharf and North Beach.

Release
The film opened in New York on 13 April 1962.
The film was originally released in the UK under the title The Grip of Fear.

Reception
On review aggregator Rotten Tomatoes, the film has an approval rating of 100% based on 7 reviews, with an average score of 8.40/10.

Awards
Ross Martin was nominated for a 1963 Golden Globe Award for Best Supporting Actor.

Notes

External links
 
 
 
  used as a television "Creature Feature" theme

1962 films
1960s crime thriller films
1960s psychological thriller films
American black-and-white films
American crime thriller films
American psychological thriller films
Columbia Pictures films
1960s English-language films
Films scored by Henry Mancini
Films about kidnapping
Films about bank robbery
Films based on American novels
Films directed by Blake Edwards
Films set in San Francisco
Films set in the San Francisco Bay Area
Films shot in San Francisco
American police detective films
Films with screenplays by the Gordons
Films about the Federal Bureau of Investigation
American neo-noir films
1960s American films